Durdham Down is an area of public open space in Bristol, England. With its neighbour Clifton Down to the southwest, it constitutes a  area known as The Downs, much used for leisure including walking, jogging and team sports. Its exposed position makes it particularly suitable for kite flying.  Durdham Down is the part of the Downs north of Stoke Road.

History 

Durdham Down was long used as grazing land. An Anglo-Saxon charter of 883 grants grazing rights over part of Durdham Down.  The down was the commons of pasture for the manor of Henbury during the Middle Ages. The land was also valuable farmland used by many farms in the area. In 1643 and 1645, during the English Civil War, Royalist and Parliamentarian armies assembled on the down.

In 1857, concerned by Victorian-built houses encroaching on the open space as the city expanded, the Bristol Corporation acquired commoners' rights on the downs, and exercised them the following year by grazing sheep.  In 1861 Durdham Down itself was bought by the City from the Lords of the Manor of Henbury for £15,000 via an Act of Parliament.  Grazing on the down declined during the 19th century, and finally ceased in 1925.

Since 1861 Durdham Down has been managed, with Clifton Down, by the Downs Committee, a joint committee of the corporation and the Society of Merchant Venturers, which owns Clifton Down. The committee appoints a Downs Ranger to oversee the Downs.

In November 1910 a Bristol Boxkite, which had been recently built by the British and Colonial Aeroplane Company's factory at the nearby village of Filton, landed on Durdham Down. During the course of that afternoon, the French pilot, M. Maurice Tetard, undertook several demonstration flights from this temporary airfield. Bristolians in large numbers flocked to The Downs to see this new-fangled flying machine.

A blue plaque on the public toilets by the water tower on Stoke Road commemorates Victoria Hughes, the toilet attendant from 1929 to 1962, who also looked after sex workers in the area. In 1977, aged 80, Hughes published her memoirs as Ladies' Mile.

Features 

The Down features clumps of scrubby hawthorns, the avenues of massive horse-chestnuts, the flat swathes of grass and the elegant bordering of Victorian houses.

The White Tree roundabout is a road junction on Durdham Down. The roundabout was constructed in the 1950s, but the name appears to date back to the 19th century.  For a short period in 1908, the White Tree was the terminus of the tram, before it was extended to Westbury.  There have been several white trees at the junction, either a silver birch or a tree with a trunk painted white.  One white tree was demolished to make way for the roundabout. Another white tree was cut down during the 1970s outbreak of Dutch elm disease.

The "Seven Sisters" are a group of pine trees on Durdham Down. A number of the trees have been lost over the years - notably in the 1990 Burns' Day storm - leaving three survivors. Replacement trees in the group have been vandalised, so an entirely new group of seven has been planted nearby.

Sports 

In the 19th century horse-races were held, especially at Easter, as well as wrestling and boxing contests and cricket matches. Nowadays the sporting tradition carries on with the Bristol Downs Football League playing on permanently laid out pitches.

The Gloucestershire County Cricket Club played its initial first-class match, which was against Surrey CCC, at Durdham Down on 2, 3 and 4 June 1870.

References

External links 
Bristol City Council: The Downs
Map of Durdham Down circa 1900

Areas of Bristol
Parks and open spaces in Bristol
The Downs, Bristol
Defunct cricket grounds in England
Cricket grounds in Bristol